Elías Jarol Rafael Emmons Cova (born 11 December 1981) is a Venezuelan football manager. He is the current assistant manager of Mineros.

Career
Emmons was initially an assistant of Del Valle Rojas at Segunda División side Estudiantes de Caroní, but became an interim for the latter stages of the 2013–14 season, where his team could not avoid relegation to the Tercera División.

Emmons was Estudiantes' manager for the 2014–15 campaign, but later returned to his role as Rojas' assistant after the club changed their name to LALA FC. After leaving LALA, he was also Horacio Matuszyczk's assistant at Mineros de Guayana.

After leaving Mineros, Emmons worked at Chicó de Guayana's under-20 team. For the 2021 campaign, he returned to LALA as manager the club in the Primera División.

References

External links

1981 births
Living people
People from Maturín
Venezuelan football managers
Venezuelan Primera División managers
Venezuelan Segunda División managers
Mineros de Guayana managers